Jørn Riel (born in Odense on 23 July 1931) is a Danish writer. He is partly known for works on Greenland as he lived there for sixteen years. One of his works was adapted to film as Before Tomorrow (Le Jour avant le lendemain).

Bibliography

Literature Awards, Grants and Prizes 
1972 - Statens Kulturfond - Engangsydelse (The Cultural Committee of the Danish State - One time fee)
1973 - Statens Kulturfond - Engangsydelse (The Cultural Committee of the Danish State - One time fee)
1974 - Statens Kulturfond - Engangsydelse (The Cultural Committee of the Danish State - One time fee)
1981 - Frank Hellers litterære pris (Literature Prize of Frank Heller)
1993 - Tom Kristensen Legatet
1995 - De Gyldne Laurbær (The Golden Laurel, the Danish booksellers literature prize)
1996 - Drassows Legat
2004 - Jeanne og Henri Nathansens Mindelegat
2004 - Statens Kunstfond. Livsvarig ydelse (The Cultural Committee of the Danish State - Lifelong grant)
2010 - Det Danske Akademis Store Pris (The Grand Prize of the Danish Academy)

References 

People from Odense
1931 births
Living people
Recipients of the Grand Prize of the Danish Academy